Fran Adams is an American actress who performed with Second City.

Biography
Adams was an ensemble member of the Chicago based improvisational comedy troupe Second City. She is a featured player in the DVD release of The Best of Second City, a compilation of some of the most memorable sketches that helped make Second City one of the United States' foremost comedy troupes. Adams was a lead player in the Second City TV pilot entitled 149 1/2 along with other players such as Steve Carell, Judith Scott and Jackie Hoffman.

She performed with the troupe during the 1988 to 1994 seasons and in 2009 was invited to perform in the 50th anniversary celebration of Second City.

References

External links
 Second City Network Fran Adams archive

Fran Adams on the In Your Kitchen network

Year of birth missing (living people)
Living people
20th-century American actresses
21st-century American actresses
American stage actresses
American sketch comedians